BJC is a three letter acronym that can mean many things:

 Balanced job complex, a way of organizing a workplace or group that is both directly democratic and also creates relative equal empowerment among all people involved.
 Baptist Joint Committee for Religious Liberty, a church-state affairs group in Washington
 Beijing-Benz DaimlerChrysler Automotive (Beijing Jeep Corporation)
 Beijing Jockey Club
 Bharatiya Jan Congress
 Bill Jefferson Clinton, an alternative to WJC (William Jefferson Clinton)
 BJC HealthCare, parent organization of Barnes-Jewish_Hospital
 Blankey Jet City
 British Journal of Cancer
 British Judo Council
 British Juggling Convention, an annual juggling convention held in the UK
 Bryce Jordan Center- A multi-purpose arena at Penn State University.
 Bubble Jet Colour - A line of inkjet printers by Canon Inc.
 Rocky Mountain Metropolitan Airport's FAA and IATA location identifier.